Schwarzach is a river of Czech Republic and Bavaria, Germany. It is a left tributary of the Naab. It passes through Waldmünchen, Rötz and Neunburg vorm Wald, and flows into the Naab near Schwarzenfeld.

See also

List of rivers of Bavaria
List of rivers of the Czech Republic

References

Rivers of the Plzeň Region
Rivers of Bavaria
Bohemian Forest
Rivers of the Upper Palatine Forest
Rivers of Germany
International rivers of Europe